Jang Geum-young (born 4 May 1980) is a South Korean sports shooter. She competed in the women's 50 metre rifle three positions event at the 2016 Summer Olympics.

References

External links
 

1980 births
Living people
South Korean female sport shooters
Olympic shooters of South Korea
Shooters at the 2016 Summer Olympics
Place of birth missing (living people)
20th-century South Korean women
21st-century South Korean women